Termas de Río Hondo International Airport  is an airport serving the city of Termas de Río Hondo in Santiago del Estero Province, Argentina.

It was built between 2010 and 2012 by Aeropuertos Argentina 2000. The airport was inaugurated on 24 July 2012 by President Cristina Fernández de Kirchner; one month later the first flight from Buenos Aires landed at the airport.

South approach and departure are over the water. There is a  blast pad on Runway 19. The Termas de Río Hondo VOR-DME (Ident: TRH) is located on the field.

Airlines and destinations

See also

Transport in Argentina
List of airports in Argentina

References

External links
OpenStreetMap - Termas de Río Hondo International Airport

OurAirports - Termas de Río Hondo international Airport

Airports in Argentina